The 1974 United States Senate election in Idaho took place on Tuesday, November 5. Democratic incumbent Frank Church was re-elected to a fourth term in office, defeating Republican Bob Smith. 

Church announced his presidential campaign in March 1976, off the strength of his victory as well as his high-profile chairmanship of the select Church Commission investigating American intelligence activity.

, this was the last time the Democrats won a U.S. Senate election in Idaho.

Primary elections
The primary was held on Tuesday, August 6.

Democratic primary

Candidates
 Frank Church, Boise, incumbent since 1957
 Leon Olson, Boise

Results

Republican primary

Candidates
 Charles Bolstridge, Nampa
 Bob Smith, Nampa, attorney
 Donald L. Winder, Boise

Results

General election

Results

See also 
 1974 United States Senate elections

References

1974
Idaho
United States Senate